1982 Uganda Cup was the eighth season of the main Ugandan football Cup.

Overview
The competition has also been known as the Kakungulu Cup and was won by Kampala City Council FC who were awarded the tie after Nile Breweries FC left the field of play after 75 minutes. KCC were leading Nile 1-0 when the final was abandoned. The Nile players walked off the pitch in protest to a foul committed by KCC’s John Latigo on Moses Musoke.  The Nile players wanted the referee to send off Latigo, but the referee gave Latigo a caution. This annoyed Nile players and they walked off the pitch leaving KCC to be awarded the trophy. The results are not available for the earlier rounds

Final

Footnotes

External links
 Uganda - List of Cup Finals - RSSSF (Mikael Jönsson, Ian King and Hans Schöggl)

Ugandan Cup
Uganda Cup
Cup